This list of shipwrecks in 1986 includes ships sunk, foundered, grounded, or otherwise lost during 1986.

January

6 January

11 January

13 January

14 January

23 January

25 January

28 January

31 January

Unknown date

February

11 February

12 February

14 February

16 February

17 February

25 February

March

4 March

6 March

22 March

23 March

24 March

26 March

April

13 April

24 April

26 April

May

14 May

16 May

23 May

25 May

28 May

30 May

31 May

June

1 June

6 June

9 June

10 June

July

2 July

7 July

11 July

13 July

19 July

25 July

August

10 August

12 August

14 August

18 August

22 August

31 August

Unknown date

September

10 September

11 September

October

10 October

15 October

16 October

22 October

30 October

November

9 November

22 November

29 November

December

6 December

10 December

19 December

24 December

25 December

Unknown date

References

See also 

1986
 
Ship